Glenea t-notata is a species of beetle in the family Cerambycidae. It was described by Charles Joseph Gahan in 1889. It is known from Nepal and Bangladesh.

References

t-notata
Beetles described in 1889